Julie Schwartz is an American rabbi. She was born in Cincinnati and, in 1986, she became the first woman to serve as an active-duty Jewish chaplain in the U.S. Navy, the very same year she was ordained by the Hebrew Union College-Jewish Institute of Religion. She counseled patients at the naval hospital in Oakland, California, and after a three-year tour of duty she returned to Cincinnati and held assorted jobs at HUC-JIR.

Eventually she became the third rabbi to be certified as a Clinical Pastoral Educator by the Association for Clinical Pastoral Educators, after which she founded HUC-JIR's course of study in pastoral counseling for rabbinical students.

In 1999, she became the first rabbi of B'nai Israel, the south side's first Jewish congregation in Fayette County, Georgia; they had previously been served by rabbinical students.

In 2011, she returned to HUC-JIR to head the pastoral care and counseling program she founded.

The art exhibit “Holy Sparks”, which opened in February 2022 at the Heller Museum and the Skirball Museum, featured 24 Jewish women artists, who had each created an artwork about a female rabbi who was a first in some way. Emily Bowen Cohen created the artwork about Schwartz.

References

Year of birth missing (living people)
Living people
United States Navy chaplains
Jewish chaplains
American Reform rabbis
Female United States Navy officers
Reform women rabbis
Rabbis from Ohio
Religious leaders from Cincinnati
21st-century American Jews
21st-century American women